Spiniphryne duhameli is a species of dreamer known from the central Pacific Ocean.  The females of this species grow to a length of  SL.  The esca contains a pair of short, slender filaments at the tip, a small, simple appendage without distal filaments on the back, and three pairs of long, slender filaments on the sides.  S. duhameli also has more dental teeth than S. gladisfenae.

References
 

Oneirodidae
Taxa named by Theodore Wells Pietsch III
Fish described in 2006